The following is a list of county roads in Flagler County, Florida.  All county roads are maintained by the county in which they reside, however not all of them are marked with standard MUTCD approved county road shields.

This list only includes routes numbered in the statewide grid, not those numbered internally by the county.

List of County Roads in Flagler County, Florida

References

FDOT Map of Flagler County
FDOT GIS data, accessed January 2014

 
County